Abdullah Aydoğdu (born September 27, 1991, in Ankara, Turkey) is a Turkish national goalball player of class B3 and Paralympian.

Sporting career
A member of Ankara Mithat Enç Görenkalpler Sport Club, Aydoğdu played in Turkey's national team at the 2012 Summer Paralympics, which became bronze medalist.

Achievements

References

Living people
1991 births
Sportspeople from Ankara
Male goalball players
Turkish goalball players
Paralympic goalball players of Turkey
Goalball players at the 2012 Summer Paralympics
Visually impaired category Paralympic competitors
Turkish blind people
Paralympic bronze medalists for Turkey
Medalists at the 2012 Summer Paralympics
Paralympic medalists in goalball
Goalball players at the 2016 Summer Paralympics
Paralympic athletes with a vision impairment
Goalball players at the 2020 Summer Paralympics
21st-century Turkish people